The OPPO A9 2020, along with OPPO A5 2020, are the successors to the OPPO A series. It was launched on 11 September 2019 in India and equipped with 48MP Ultra Wide Quad Camera, 5000 mAh Ultra Battery and reverse charging capability.

Specifications

Hardware
The OPPO A9 2020 is powered by 4x2.0 GHz + 4x1.8 GHz octa-core processors with Qualcomm Snapdragon 665 chipset. It has a dual Sim and comes equipped with 128GB of Rom and up to 256GB additional memory via MicroSD for extra storage. The OPPO A9 2020 operates on ColorOS 6 which is a customized version of Android 9 Pie. 7.1

Memory
The OPPO A9 2020 has 128GB of built in memory and a dedicated Micro SD slot which supports up to 256GB of additional USF2.1 storage.

Display
The OPPO A9 2020 features a 6.5-inch (165mm) Multi-touch capacitive screen with 1600 by 720 pixels resolution. The new water drop notch with sunlight screen and blue shield display has a screen to body ratio of 89.0%.

Battery
The OPPO A9 2020 is equipped with a Non-removable 5000 mAh Li-Po battery This ultra battery is featured with reverse charging capability.

Camera
The OPPO A9 2020 fits five separate cameras including a 16MP front camera featuring AI beautification and 4 cameras on the rear, a 48MP main camera with 1/2.25 senor and f/1.8 aperture, an 8MP 119° ultrawide lens with 1/4 sensor for panoramic pictures, a 2MP wide angle lens with 1/5 sensor and a 2MP with depth sensor for artistic portrait effects.

Software
The OPPO A9 2020 is equipped with ColorOS 6.1 which based on the Android 9 mobile operating system.

References

External links 
 OPPO A9 2020

Android (operating system) devices
Mobile phones with multiple rear cameras
Mobile phones introduced in 2019
Oppo smartphones